Kane Douglas (born 1 June 1989) is an Australian professional rugby union footballer who currently plays as a lock for the Bordeaux club in France.

Douglas previously played a season with Irish province Leinster, as well as eight seasons in Super Rugby for  New South Wales and Queensland. He represented Australia in international rugby, including at the 2015 Rugby World Cup.

Kane Douglas is the middle brother of three sons born to Christopher and Patricia (Trish) Douglas. His older brother, Luke Douglas is an Australian-born Scotland rugby league footballer. Younger brother Jake plays in England for the Yorkshire side Driffield RUFC.

Kane Douglas played his junior rugby with the Yamba Buccaneers, captaining the Under 17 team to a premiership in 2006.

In 2008, Douglas was selected to train with the NSW Waratahs Academy under the guidance of Head Coach Joe Barakat. He was promoted to Junior Waratahs professional squad in 2009 making his debut for the Waratahs against the Queensland Reds in 2010 off the bench. He immediately forced his way into the starting side and has missed just four games since, two of those due to the suspension.

Douglas was named to debut for Australia against Argentina at the Gold Coast, where he gained his first Australian Wallabies cap on 17 September 2012.

On 20 May 20, 2014, Leinster confirmed signing Douglas for the 2014–15 season.  He played his first game for Leinster v Cardiff Blues on Friday 26 September 2014.

On 31 July 2015, Douglas returned to Australia to sign for Super Rugby side Queensland Reds on a three-year deal from the 2015 season onwards. Douglas would return to France with Top 14 side Bordeaux from the 2018-19 season.

References

External links
Waratahs profile
Wallabies profile (2013)
itsrugby.co.uk profile

1989 births
Australian rugby union players
Australian people of Scottish descent
Australia international rugby union players
New South Wales Waratahs players
Leinster Rugby players
Queensland Reds players
Rugby union locks
Living people
Australian expatriate rugby union players
Expatriate rugby union players in Ireland
Australian expatriate sportspeople in Ireland
New South Wales Country Eagles players
Rugby union players from New South Wales